Diégonéfla is a town in south-central Ivory Coast. It is a sub-prefecture and commune of Oumé Department in Gôh Region, Gôh-Djiboua District.

In 2021, the population of the sub-prefecture of Diégonéfla was 74,076.

Villages
The 14 villages of the sub-prefecture of Diégonéfla and their population in 2014 are :

References

Sub-prefectures of Gôh
Communes of Gôh